Diaphus lobatus is a species of lanternfish found in the Western Indian Ocean.

References

Myctophidae
Taxa named by Basil Nafpaktitis
Fish described in 1978
Fish of the Indian Ocean